is a Japanese manga artist born on December 16, 1959, in Kanazawa, Ishikawa Prefecture, Japan.

Career 
From the time she was in high school, she assisted her older sister, professional manga artist Yukiko Kai. After graduating high school, she began working for a printing company in Kanazawa City, but she soon quit in order to become a full-time assistant to her sister. She also began to assist other professional artists, most notably Moto Hagio.

Throughout this period, Hatsu was creating self-published manga with her friend Yasuko Sakata (who also went on to become a prominent professional manga artist), and sometime around 1980, the two of them coined the term yaoi. In 1980, Yukiko Kai died of stomach cancer at the age of 26. The following year, Hatsu made her professional debut in the magazine ALLAN  with the short story .

Her work has been published in numerous magazines, including DUO (published by Asahi Sonorama),  (published by Shinshokan), Petit Flower (published by Shogakukan, later retitled flowers),  (published by the Asahi Shimbun Corporation, later retitled ). Hatsu served as an adjunct instructor at Kyoto Seika University until retiring in 2005 due to health issues.

Works

(April 1984)

(July 1987)

(November  1988, bunko edition released June 2000)

(July 1989)

(September 1989, bunko edition December 1999)

(April 1990, bunko edition June 2000)

(Published in  [later changed to ] from 1991 until 2007.) A series of short occult mystery stories set in Meiji Period Japan and featuring Ren, a young man who works in an antique shop named Uryūdō and who can see and communicate with the spirits that inhabit antiques. Currently available in wide-ban and bunko editions from Asahi Shimbun.  Was a Jury Recommended work in the 2008 Japan Media Arts Festival.

 (July 1992, Asahi Sonorama, bunko edition September 2000, new edition October 2007); published in English in 2000 by ComicsOne.

 (November 1992, Asahi Sonorama; bunko edition 2001 (Hakusensha), new edition October 2007. A collection of short love stories; the title story is about a young man involved with his brother's widow. Published in English by ComicsOne.

(November 1993, bunko edition June 2003, new edition October 2007)

(June 1994)

(July 1995, new edition October 2007)

(November 1995, bunko edition June 2000, new edition October 2007)

(May 1996)

(September 1997, new edition October 2007)

(September 1997)

(March 1999)

A series of short stories with an element of fantasy set in Victorian England and centering on Cornelius Everdeanne, a young, handsome heir to an earldom. Currently available in a wide-ban edition from Shogakukan.

References

External links
  波津彬子公式サイト　波万波  (official site)

1959 births
Living people
Manga artists
People from Kanazawa, Ishikawa
20th-century Japanese women artists